John II of Alexandria may refer to:

 Pope John I (II) of Alexandria (Patriarch John II of Alexandria), ruled in 496–505
 Pope John II (III) of Alexandria (Patriarch John III of Alexandria), ruled in 505–516